The 2013 UEFA Regions' Cup is the 8th edition of the UEFA Regions' Cup.

Preliminary round 
The 8 teams in the preliminary round have been drawn into two group of four, with the following countries hosting each group's matches:
Group A –  Turkey
Group B –  South East FYR Macedonia
Matches in the preliminary round were played between 30 August and 13 September 2012. The two group winners and the best runners-up advance to the intermediary round (only the results of the runners-up against the winners and third-ranked team in each group are taken into account).

Group A

Group B

Intermediary round 
The 32 teams which went straight through to the intermediary round will join by the two group winners and best runner-up from the preliminary round. The 32 teams have been drawn into eight groups of four, with the following countries hosting each group's matches:
Group 1 – 
Group 2 – 
Group 3 – 
Group 4 – 
Group 5 – 
Group 6 – 
Group 7 – 
Group 8 – 
Matches in the intermediary round will be played between 10 August 2012 and 26 April 2013. The winners of each group will qualify for the final tournament.

Group 1

Group 2

Group 3

Group 4

Group 5

Group 6

Group 7

Group 8

Final tournament
The final tournament was held in Veneto, Italy from 22 to 29 June 2013.

Group stage

The group stage draw took place on 9 May 2013, producing two groups of four teams each. The two group winners advance to the final, while the runners-up of each group receive bronze medals.

Group A

Group B

Final

Top goalscorers

7 goals

  Imre Domokos

5 goals

  Sergei Orlov

4 goals

  Franco Ballarini
  Roman Asadov
  Krisztián Less
  Paul Maguire
  Yakup Alkan
  Shadi Hammudi

3 goals

  Nedžad Džanić
  Boris Garros
  Stefano Guandalini
  Aleksandr Fuflygin
  Ryan Moffatt
  Balázs Pálvölgyi
  Hristo Bangeev
  Mihai Ene
  Adrian Puiulet
  Recep Hazır
  Kuengíenda Onesi
  Nikola Donevski

See also 
UEFA Regions' Cup

References

External links
Official UEFA Regions' Cup site

2013
Regions